Bidens campylotheca, the viper beggarticks, is a species of flowering plant in the family Asteraceae. It belongs to the genus Bidens, collectively called kokoʻolau or koʻokoʻolau in the Hawaiian language. It is found only in the Hawaiian Islands.

Its natural habitat is lowland moist forests. It is threatened by habitat loss due to the spread of invasive weeds and brushfires.

Subspecies
 Bidens campylotheca subsp. campylotheca  
 Bidens campylotheca subsp. pentamera (Sherff) Ganders & Nagata

References

campylotheca
Endemic flora of Hawaii
Plants described in 1856
Taxonomy articles created by Polbot